The 2014 Patriot League Men's Soccer Tournament was the 25th edition of the tournament. It determined the Patriot League's automatic berth into the 2014 NCAA Division I Men's Soccer Championship.

Bucknell won the tournament, beating Boston University in the championship match. Bucknell won its fourth Patriot League Championship and became the first ever 5-seed to win the Patriot League Men's Soccer Tournament.

Qualification 
The top six teams in the Patriot League based on their conference regular season records qualified for the tournament. The 3rd and 4th seeded teams hosted the 6th and 5th seeded teams, respectively, in the quarterfinals. Boston University hosted the semi-finals and finals by way of finishing first in the regular season.

Bracket

Schedule

Quarterfinals

Semifinals

Championship

Tournament Best XI 
 Sebastiaan Blickman (MVP), Bucknell
 Mark Leisensperger, Bucknell
 Chris Thorsheim, Bucknell
 Brian Ward, Bucknell
 Dominique Badji, Boston University
 Kelvin Madzongwe, Boston University
 Cameron Souri, Boston University
 Winston Boldt, Army
 Sean Morgan, Army
 Sam Bascom, Navy
 Derek Vogel, Navy

See also 
 Patriot League
 2014 NCAA Division I Men's Soccer Season
 2014 NCAA Division I Men's Soccer Championship

References 

Patriot League Men's Soccer Tournament